Species is the fifth EP by Japanese metalcore band Crossfaith. It was released on 20 May 2020 in Japan, and later released on 22 May 2020 worldwide.

Background and promotion
Crossfaith debuted their first single "Endorphin" exclusively on Daniel P. Carter's BBC Radio 1 Rock Show, the day before the release of the single worldwide. However, the EP wasn't announced until the release of the second single "Digital Parasite" on 9 April 2020.

In an interview with Rock Sound, the frontman, Kenta Koie would explain that Species would alter the course of the band for "at the very least for the next 10 years". He would further go on to explain about the departure in sound from Ex Machina to Species:

Critical reception

The EP received mostly positive reviews, but also mixed reviews from several critics. Carlos Zelaya from Dead Press! rated the EP positively calling it: "Wasting no time and still managing to spring surprises with their multi-dimensional sound, Crossfaith continue to impress with Species." Distorted Sound scored the EP 8 out of 10 and said: "In recent times CROSSFAITH have branched out their sound in a variety of different directions whilst continuing to stay cohesive and true to all the invigorating elements that brought them such adoration throughout their journey. Species is a compacted burst packed with fury and fun that will greatly please their existing fans as well as grab the attention of any potential newcomers. If you're new to the weird and wonderful world of CROSSFAITH this is the ideal appetiser to get you acquainted."

In a less favourable review, Kerrang! gave the EP 2 out of 5 and stated: "Overall, Species hasn't evolved enough to justify its existence." Wall of Sound gave the EP a score 8/10 and saying: "Crossfaith continue to be a dominant outfit among Japan's heavy music scene. It will be interesting to see what kind of live show for SPECIES they bring back to Australia, because their last outing made them an unmissable band in my book."

Track listing

Personnel
Crossfaith
 Kenta Koie – lead vocals
 Kazuki Takemura – guitars
 Terufumi Tamano – keyboards, programming, samples, backing vocals
 Hiroki Ikegawa – bass
 Tatsuya Amano – drums

Additional musicians
 Jin Dogg – guest vocals on "None of Your Business"

Charts

Release history

References

External links
 

2020 EPs
Crossfaith EPs
UNFD albums